Queensway station may refer to:
Queensway tube station, London, United Kingdom
Queensway station (OC Transpo), Ottawa, Canada